Siphonogorgia is a genus of soft corals in the family Nidaliidae. Like other members of this family, these corals do not contain symbiotic zooxanthellae.

Species
The World Register of Marine Species includes the following species in the genus:

Siphonogorgia agassizii (Deichmann, 1936)
Siphonogorgia alba Utinomi, 1960
Siphonogorgia alexandri (Nutting, 1908)
Siphonogorgia annectens Thomson & Simpson, 1909
Siphonogorgia annulata (Harrison, 1908)
Siphonogorgia asperula Thomson & Simpson, 1909
Siphonogorgia boschmai Verseveldt, 1966
Siphonogorgia caribaea (Deichmann, 1936)
Siphonogorgia chalmersae Verseveldt, 1966
Siphonogorgia collaris Nutting, 1908
Siphonogorgia crassa (Wright & Studer, 1889)
Siphonogorgia cylindrita Kükenthal, 1896
Siphonogorgia densa Chalmers, 1928
Siphonogorgia dipsacea (Wright & Studer, 1889)
Siphonogorgia dofleini Kükenthal, 1906
Siphonogorgia duriuscula Thomson & Simpson, 1909
Siphonogorgia eminens Chalmers, 1928
Siphonogorgia flavocapitata (Harrison, 1908)
Siphonogorgia fragilis Verseveldt, 1965
Siphonogorgia godeffroyi Kölliker, 1874
Siphonogorgia gracilis (Harrison, 1908)
Siphonogorgia grandior Chalmers, 1928
Siphonogorgia harrisoni Thomson & Mackinnon, 1910
Siphonogorgia hicksoni Thomson & Mackinnon, 1910
Siphonogorgia indica Thomson, 1905
Siphonogorgia intermedia Thomson & Henderson, 1906
Siphonogorgia koellikeri Wright & Studer, 1889
Siphonogorgia lobata Verseveldt, 1982
Siphonogorgia macrospiculata (Thomson & Henderson, 1906)
Siphonogorgia macrospina Whitelegge, 1897
Siphonogorgia media Thomson & Simpson, 1909
Siphonogorgia miniacea Kükenthal, 1896
Siphonogorgia mirabilis Klunziger, 1877
Siphonogorgia obspiculata Chalmers, 1928
Siphonogorgia obtusa Chalmers, 1928
Siphonogorgia pallida Studer, 1889
Siphonogorgia palmata Thomson & Simpson, 1909
Siphonogorgia pauciflora Chalmers, 1928
Siphonogorgia pendula Studer, 1889
Siphonogorgia pichoni Verseveldt, 1971
Siphonogorgia planoramosa Harrison, 1908
Siphonogorgia purpurea (Harrison, 1908)
Siphonogorgia pustulosa Studer, 1889
Siphonogorgia ramosa Chalmers, 1928
Siphonogorgia retractilis (Harrison, 1908)
Siphonogorgia robusta Thomson & Mackinnon, 1910
Siphonogorgia rotunda Harrison, 1908
Siphonogorgia rugosa Chalmers, 1928
Siphonogorgia scoparia Wright & Studer, 1889
Siphonogorgia simplex Chalmers, 1928
Siphonogorgia siphonogorgica (Harrison, 1908)
Siphonogorgia splendens Kükenthal, 1906
Siphonogorgia squarrosa Studer, 1878
Siphonogorgia variabilis (Hickson, 1903)

References

Nidaliidae